Nether Lands is the fourth album by American singer-songwriter Dan Fogelberg, released in 1977 (see 1977 in music). The album title is a play on Nederland, Colorado, the location of one of the studios used to record the album.

Track listing
All songs written by Dan Fogelberg.
"Nether Lands" – 5:32
"Once upon a Time" – 3:38
"Dancing Shoes" – 3:28
"Lessons Learned" – 4:52
"Loose Ends" – 5:23
"Love Gone By" – 3:04
"Promises Made" – 3:18
"Give Me Some Time" – 3:20
"Scarecrow's Dream" For Don Quixote, Walt Disney and the Wizard of Oz – 4:10
"Sketches" – 3:32
"False Faces" – 4:52

Personnel
 Dan Fogelberg – vocals, electric and acoustic pianos, ARP synthesizer, electric and acoustic guitars, orchestral arrangement (1), finger cymbals (3), pipe organ (5), organ (6), sleigh bells and harpsichord (9)
 Kenneth A. Buttrey – drums (2, 6, 7, 8, 11), percussion (8)
 Al Perkins – dobro, pedal steel guitar
 Dominic Frontiere – orchestral arrangements and conductor (1, 11), arrangement (10)
 Don Henley – harmony vocals (2, 5, 6)
 Russ Kunkel – drums and congas (4)
 Joe Lala – congas (6)
 Frank Marocco – accordion (3)
 Norbert Putnam – bass guitar, string quartet arrangement (3)
 J.D. Souther – harmony vocals (5), backing vocals (11)
 John Stronach – maracas and tambourine (7)
 Joe Vitale – drums (5)
 Joe Walsh – rhythm electric guitar (5)
 Tim Weisberg – flute (8)

Production
 Produced by Dan Fogelberg and Norbert Putnam
 Engineer – John Stronach
 Mix-down Engineer – Marty Lewis
 Assistant Engineers – Jeff Guercio, Mark Guercio, John Henning, Marty Lewis, Bruce Hensal and Gary Landinsky.
 Recorded at:
 Caribou Ranch, Nederland, Colorado
 Record Plant Studios, Los Angeles, California
 Quadrafonic Sound Studios, Nashville, Tennessee
 Record Plant, Sausalito, California
 North Star Studios, Boulder, Colorado
 Mastered by Glenn Meadows at Masterfonics, Inc., Nashville, Tennessee.

Other credits
 Photography by Andy Katz, Boulder, Colorado.
 Design by John Kosh
 Interior painting by Dan Fogelberg

Charts
Album – Billboard (United States)

References

Dan Fogelberg albums
1977 albums
Albums arranged by David Campbell (composer)
Albums produced by Norbert Putnam